The 2013 Skate Canada International was the second event of six in the 2013–14 ISU Grand Prix of Figure Skating, a senior-level international invitational competition series. It was held at the Harbour Station in Saint John, New Brunswick on October 24–27. Medals were awarded in the disciplines of men's singles, ladies' singles, pair skating, and ice dancing. Skaters earned points toward qualifying for the 2013–14 Grand Prix Final.

Eligibility
Skaters who reached the age of 14 by July 1, 2013 were eligible to compete on the 2013 senior Grand Prix circuit.

Entries
The entries were as follows.

Changes to initial lineup
On September 26, 2013, it was reported that Yuna Kim withdrew because of a foot injury. Courtney Hicks was named to replace her. Kiira Korpi also withdrew and was replaced by Natalia Popova. Yuko Kavaguti and Alexander Smirnov withdrew due to an injury to Smirnov. They were replaced by Haven Denney and Brandon Frazier. Alena Leonova withdrew due to a leg injury. No replacement was announced.

Results

Men

Ladies

Pairs

Ice dancing

References

External links
 Skate Canada
 Entry list
 2013 Skate Canada International results

Skate Canada International
Skate Canada International, 2013
Skate Canada International 
Skate Canada International
Skate Canada International